Heinz-Georg Lemm (1 June 1919 – 17 November 1994) was a German Oberst (colonel) of the Wehrmacht and general in the Bundeswehr who served as Chief of the Army Office.

Career
During World War II, Lemm served in the Wehrmacht and was a recipient of the  Knight's Cross of the Iron Cross with Oak Leaves and Swords. He was promoted to Major 1943, Oberstleutnant 1944 and Oberst 1945.

Lemm joined the Bundeswehr in 1957 and commanded the 7th Panzergrenadier-Brigade of the 3rd Panzer-Division in Hamburg until 1963, when he was promoted to Brigadegeneral. In 1970 he was promoted to Generalmajor and commanded the 5th Panzer-Division in Diez. Promoted further in 1974, he was named Chief of the Troop Office of the Bundeswehr, with the rank of Generalleutnant. He was awarded the Great Cross of Merit with Star and the Legion of Merit; he retired in 1979. After this he became honorary president (Ehrenpräsident) of the Association of Knight's Cross Recipients.

Awards
Iron Cross (1939) 2nd Class (6 October 1939) & 1st Class (31 December 1940)
Wound Badge in Silver
Demyansk Shield
Infantry Assault Badge in Silver
 Eastern Medal
Close Combat Clasp in Bronze and Silver
Tank Destruction Badge for Individual Combatants
German Cross in Gold on 19 December 1941 as Oberleutnant in the 2./Infanterie-Regiment 27
Knight's Cross of the Iron Cross with Oak Leaves and Swords
Knight's Cross on 14 April 1943 as Hauptmann and commander of I./Füsilier-Regiment 27
Oak Leaves on 11 July 1944 as Major and commander of I./Füsilier-Regiment 27
Swords on 15 March 1945 as Oberstleutnant and commander of Füsilier-Regiment 27
Great Cross of Merit with Star
Legion of Merit

References

Citations

Bibliography

 
 
 
 

1919 births
1994 deaths
Bundeswehr generals
People from Schwerin
Knights Commander of the Order of Merit of the Federal Republic of Germany
Recipients of the Gold German Cross
Recipients of the Knight's Cross of the Iron Cross with Oak Leaves and Swords
German prisoners of war in World War II held by the Soviet Union
Foreign recipients of the Legion of Merit
People from the Free State of Mecklenburg-Schwerin
Lieutenant generals of the German Army
Military personnel from Mecklenburg-Western Pomerania